Thomas Pettigrew (born 1936) was a Scottish football left back who made 110 appearances in the Scottish League for Stirling Albion. He was capped by Scotland at amateur level.

Honours 
Stirling Albion
 Scottish League Second Division: 1961–62

References 

1936 births
Living people
Scottish footballers
Scottish Football League players
Queen's Park F.C. players
Association football fullbacks
Scotland amateur international footballers
Footballers from Glasgow
Date of birth missing (living people)
Stirling Albion F.C. players
Chelmsford City F.C. players
Southern Football League players
Scottish expatriate sportspeople in Zimbabwe
Scottish expatriate footballers
Expatriate footballers in Zimbabwe
Zimbabwe Premier Soccer League players